This is a list of Sheriffs of Essex County, Massachusetts.  In the earliest days of the county the office of Sheriff was called the Marshall.   Since 1692 the office has been called the Sheriff.   The Sheriff originally was an appointed office, it has been an elected position since 1856.  The Sheriff is elected to serve a six-year term.

The current Essex County Sheriff is Kevin Coppinger.

Government of Essex County, Massachusetts

Massachusetts, Essex
Sheriffs of Essex County, Massachusetts